The Académie des Sciences Morales et Politiques (Academy of Moral and Political Sciences) is a French learned society. It is one of the five academies of the Institut de France.

Organisation
The members of the Académie are elected by peers. It is made of 50 members in 6 different sections depending on their specialisations:
 I : Philosophy
 II : Morals and Sociology
 III : Law
 IV : Political economics, statistics and finances
 V : History and geography
 VI : General section, formerly called « membres libres » (free members)

History 
The Académie was founded in 1795, suppressed in 1803, and reestablished in 1832 through the appeal of Guizot to King Louis Philippe. It is divided into five sections and has for its chief purpose the discussion of mental philosophy, law and jurisprudence, political economy and statistics, general and philosophical history, and politics, administration, and finance. It distributes the Baujour, Faucher, Bonnefous, Halphen, Bordin, and other prizes, publishes Mémoires, and holds its annual meeting each December.

Role and missions
Being under the protection of the president of the Republic, the Academy, a distinctive legal entity with particular status, promotes regular meetings and debates devoted towards fundamental or unanswered topics.
In the last years, some of the themes were:
 State and religion (1994)
 The role of the State in the beginning of the 21st century (2000)
 Man and his Planet (2004)
 Cross-looks on Europe (2004)
 Is France sick of its Justice? (2006)

List of current members 

 Gérald Antoine 
 Jean Bæchler
 Marianne Bastid-Bruguière
 Pierre Bauchet
 Alain Besançon 
 Marcel Boiteux
 Jacques Boré 
 Bernard Bourgeois 
 Gabriel de Broglie
 Jean-Claude Casanova  
 Chantal Delsol 
 Renaud Denoix de Saint Marc 
 François d'Orcival
 Roland Drago 
 Jacques Dupâquier
 Yvon Gattaz 
 Shlomo ha-Levi
 Lucien Israël 
 Jacques de Larosière 
 Emmanuel Le Roy Ladurie 
 Jean Mesnard 
 Thierry de Montbrial 
 Alain Plantey 
 Bertrand Saint-Sernin 
 Pierre Tabatoni 
 François Terré 
 Claudine Tiercelin 
 Jean Tulard

List of foreign associate members 

 Charles III of the United Kingdom
 Prince Hassan of Jordan
 Juan Carlos I of Spain 
 Dora Bakoyannis
 Stephen Breyer
 Jean-Claude Juncker
 Ismail Kadare
 Mario Monti 
 Javier Pérez de Cuéllar

References

External links 
  Official site

Institut de France
 
1795 establishments in France